Spalona may refer to the following places in Poland:
Spalona, Kłodzko County in Gmina Bystrzyca Kłodzka, Kłodzko County in Lower Silesian Voivodeship (SW Poland)
Spalona, Legnica County in Gmina Kunice, Legnica County in Lower Silesian Voivodeship (SW Poland)